The 1980 Grambling State Tigers football team represented Grambling State University as a member of the Southwestern Athletic Conference (SWAC) during the 1980 NCAA Division I-AA football season. Led by 38th-year head coach Eddie Robinson, the Tigers compiling an overall record of 10–2 and a mark of 5–1 in conference play, and sharing the SWAC title with Jackson State. Grambling State was invited to the NCAA Division I-AA Football Championship playoffs, where they lost to eventual national champion Boise State. The Tigers won a black college football national championship.

Schedule

Roster

References

Grambling State
Grambling State Tigers football seasons
Black college football national champions
Southwestern Athletic Conference football champion seasons
Grambling State Tigers football